Sandra Köppen-Zuckschwerdt (born 15 May 1975 in Potsdam) is a German judoka.

She also won a gold medal in sumo wrestling at the 2005 World Games.

Achievements

References

External links
 
 

1975 births
Living people
German female judoka
Judoka at the 2000 Summer Olympics
Judoka at the 2004 Summer Olympics
Judoka at the 2008 Summer Olympics
Olympic judoka of Germany
Sportspeople from Potsdam
German sumo wrestlers
Female sumo wrestlers
Competitors at the 2001 World Games
Competitors at the 2005 World Games
World Games gold medalists
World Games bronze medalists
21st-century German women